There are two official holidays in Islam, Eid al-Fitr and Eid al-Adha, which are celebrated by Muslims worldwide. Both holidays occur on dates in the lunar Islamic calendar, which is different from the solar-based Gregorian calendar, so they are observed on different Gregorian dates every year. There are a number of other days of note and festivals, some common to all Muslims, others specific to Shia Islam as a whole or branches thereof.

Both Eid al-Fitr and Eid al-Adha follow a period of 10 holy days or nights: the last 10 nights of Ramadan (Eid al-Fitr), and the first 10 days of Dhu al-Hijjah (Eid al-Adha). The Night of Power, one of the last 10 nights of Ramadan, is the holiest night of the year. Conversely, the Day of Arafah, the day before Eid al-Adha, is the holiest day of the Islamic year.

Additionally, Friday is considered the holiest day of the week, and in Islamic tradition, is considered a celebration in itself. Friday Prayers (Juma) are congregational prayers held in mosques, and Muslims are encouraged to wear clean and refined clothes, perfume, and bathe. It's customary to eat special meals with family on this day.

Holidays
Eid al-Fitr is celebrated at the end of Ramadan (a month of fasting during daylight hours), and Muslims may perform acts of zakat (charity) on the occasion, which begins after the new moon is sighted for the beginning of the month of Shawwal. Celebration begins with prayers on the morning of 1 Shawwal, followed by breakfast, and often celebratory meals throughout the day.

Eid al-Adha is celebrated on the tenth day of Dhu al-Hijjah, when the Hajj pilgrimage takes place and lasts for four days. Muslims may perform an act of zakat and friendship by slaughtering a sheep and distributing the meat to family, friends, and to the poor. Muslims are also encouraged to be especially friendly and reach out to one another during this period.

Religious practices

Fasting

Muslims celebrate when the Quran was first revealed to Prophet Muhammed by fasting from dawn to sunset during Ramadan, the ninth month of the Islamic calendar. Fasting is a purifying experience so that Muslims can gain compassion and deepen their faith in Allah.

The act of fasting represents the condition experienced by the needy, who although already hungry must also fast for Ramadan. Muslims fast by denying themselves food, water and all related sexual activity with their spouses, but people with chronic diseases or unhealthy conditions such as diabetes, and children are exempt from fasting. Travelers, and women who are menstruating or nursing a baby, are exempt from fasting but are required to fast later. A person's observance of fasting can be for naught if religiously forbidden acts are made, such as Ghibah (backbiting others) and deceiving others.

Pilgrimage

Hajj

Umrah

Dates of holidays and other days of note
The Islamic calendar is based on the synodic period of the Moon's revolution around the Earth, approximately 29 days. The Islamic calendar alternates months of 29 and 30 days (which begin with the new moon). Twelve of these months make up an Islamic year, which is 11 days shorter than the Gregorian year. Some Gregorian dates may vary slightly from those given, and may also vary by country. See Islamic calendar.

Notes to table

References

Further reading
 Leaman, Oliver, "Festivals of Love", in Muhammad in History, Thought, and Culture: An Encyclopedia of the Prophet of God (2 vols.), Edited by C. Fitzpatrick and A. Walker, Santa Barbara, ABC-CLIO, 2014, Vol I, pp. 197–199.

External links
 The Umm al-Qura Calendar of Saudi Arabia (with date converter valid from 1937 to 2077)

 
Religious holidays